Charles Seymour, 2nd Baron Seymour of Trowbridge (c. 1621 – 25 August 1665) was the son of Francis Seymour, 1st Baron Seymour of Trowbridge, whom he succeeded in the barony in 1664. Francis had been a younger brother of William Seymour, 2nd Duke of Somerset.

Prior to his ennoblement, he represented Great Bedwyn in the Short Parliament of 1640 and Wiltshire in the Cavalier Parliament from 1661 to 1664.

He married firstly, on 4 April 1632, Mary, daughter of Thomas Smith of Soley in Chilton Foliat, a village northwest of Hungerford. The couple had one son and two daughters; one of their daughters, Frances (bef. 1654–1716), would marry Sir George Hungerford. The Hungerfords had at least six children together. He married secondly, in 1654, Elizabeth Alington (1635–c.1691), daughter of William Alington, 1st Baron Alington of Killard (14 March 1610/1611, d. circa October 1648); they had five sons and two daughters. One of his notable descendants, his three times great-grandson, was James Smithson. The poet George Keate was another descendant.

Both of Charles's surviving sons, Francis and Charles, ultimately succeeded to the dukedom of Somerset that had been their grandfather's. His daughter, Honora Seymour, married Sir Charles Gerard, 3rd Baronet. Charles Seymour was succeeded in the barony by his elder son, Francis.

References

Sources
 G.E.C. (G.E.Cokayne) & Geoffrey H. White, The Complete Peerage or A history of the House of Lords and all its members from the earliest times, vol. XI, p. 641, St. Catherine Press, 1949.

1621 births
1665 deaths
English MPs 1640 (April)
English MPs 1661–1679
C
Baron Seymour of Trowbridge
Members of the Parliament of England (pre-1707) for Wiltshire